Yonggye Station is a station of Daegu Subway Line 1 at Dong-gu in Daegu, South Korea.

Year-The number of passenger
 1998-1012
 1999-1449
 2000-undisclosed
 2001-2049
 2002-2215
 2003-1098
 2004-1973
 2005-1941
 2006-2258
 2007-2241
 2008-2195
 2009-2132

Dong District, Daegu
Daegu Metro stations